John Brown (died December 13, 1815) was an American Congressman from the seventh district of Maryland.

Brown's birth date and location are unknown, but he served as a member of the Maryland House of Delegates from 1807 to 1808 and was elected as a Democratic-Republican to the Eleventh Congress in 1809.  He was reelected to the Twelfth Congress, but resigned before the close of the Eleventh Congress to accept an appointment as clerk of the court of Queen Anne's County, Maryland, an office he held until his death in Centerville, Maryland.  He is interred in Chesterfield Cemetery.

References

18th-century births
1815 deaths
Year of birth unknown
Members of the Maryland House of Delegates
People from Queen Anne's County, Maryland
Democratic-Republican Party members of the United States House of Representatives from Maryland